Thenmavin Kompath is a 1994 Indian Malayalam-language romantic comedy film written and directed by Priyadarshan. It was produced and edited by N. Gopalakrishnan. The film stars Mohanlal, Shobana, and Nedumudi Venu, with Kaviyoor Ponnamma, K. P. A. C. Lalitha, Sukumari, Kuthiravattam Pappu, Sreenivasan, Sankaradi, and Sharat Saxena in supporting roles. The  background score was composed by S. P. Venkatesh, while the Berny-Ignatius duo composed the songs. K. V. Anand was the cinematographer.

The film performed well at the box office and was the  highest-grossing Malayalam film of the year. The film won two National Film Awards—Best Cinematography for Anand and Best Production Design for Sabu Cyril, and five Kerala State Film Awards (including Best Film with Popular Appeal and Aesthetic Value). Thenmavin Kombath is now considered by audiences and critics to be among the best comedy films in Malayalam cinema.

The film was remade in Tamil as Muthu (1995), in Hindi as Saat Rang Ke Sapne (1998) by Priyadarshan himself and in Kannada as Sahukara (2004). The subplot of a man becoming a stranger amidst people speaking in a language unknown to him went on to inspire the core plot of the 2013 Hindi film Chennai Express.

Plot 

The story revolves around Manikyan, Sreekrishnan, Karthumpi, and the love triangle between them. Initially, Manikyan and Karthumpi don't get along initially and get into intense arguments. But they fall in love as time goes on. Manikyan works for Sreekrishnan and Sreekrishnan sees him as a brother. Appakkala is a servant of Sreekrishnan and has a rivalry with Manikyan.

Once when they both are returning from a fair after shopping, Sreekrishnan sees Karthumpi and gets attracted. But then a fight erupts there and they all have to flee. Sreekrishnan flees alone, while Manikyan has to take Karthumpi with him. At night, he flees in the opposite direction and so loses his way. Karthumpi knows the way back, but she pretends she does not know it and enjoys the fun. Manikyan has to struggle to get out of that place. Manikyan says a crude word to a shop owner, an old lady and also peeks into a room with a married couple without consent. He is tied to a tree as punishment but then freed as he apologizes. It is Karthumpi who causes Manikyan to land in trouble because he didn't understand what the crude word meant. Karthumpi reveals that she is homeless and that her sister was murdered by a Mallikettu Policeman (Sharat Sexena) who is also her brother-in-law. During this time, they develop feelings for each other. 

Upon returning to Manikyan's village, Sreekrishnan proposes to her and plans to marry her. Manikyan is unable to resist as Sreekrishnan is like an elder brother to him. But Karthumpi opposes it. When Sreekrishnan gets to know about this, he becomes furious and sees Manikyan as his rival and tries to take revenge. One day, The Mallikettu policeman arrives and attacks Sreekrishnan. Manikyan interferes and engages in a duel with the policeman. Manikyan wins the duel. The policeman faints and Manikyan warns him that he would chop his limbs off the next time.

Another day, Appakala spreads lies that Manikyan murdered Sreekrishnan upon finding his flip-flop and towel in the pond. Manikyan tries to prove his innocence to his father and mother, but they don't believe him. Karthumpi feels sympathetic towards Manikyan. Manikyan runs into Appakala and is furious with Appakala spreading lies about him. They both engage in a fight. The townsfolk chases Manikyan and Karthumpi through the woods and the water and through a dusty road. Finally, Sreekrishnan appears and everyone stops chasing. Everyone in town realizes that Appakalan has fooled them all. He is punished by making him do sit ups in front of everyone. Sreekrishnan realizes his mistakes and marries the woman who loved him for so long and also reconciles with Manikyan as he unites with Karthumpi.

Cast 
 Mohanlal as Manikyan
 Shobhana as Karthumpi
 Nedumudi Venu as Sreekrishnan Thampuran
 Kaviyoor Ponnamma as Yeshodhamma
 KPAC Lalitha as Karthu
 Sukumari as Ginjimooda Gandhari
 Sreenivasan as Appakkala
 Sankaradi as Kannayyan
 Kuthiravattom Pappu as Chakkutty
 Geetha Vijayan as Chinnu
 Nandhu as Thimmayan
 Sonia as Kuyilu
 Khadeeja as Aadivasi
 Sharat Saxena as Mallikkettu

Soundtrack 

R. D. Burman was initially signed in as the music composer for the film, as revealed by Burman himself in an interview to journalists in Cochin, during his visit to the city, just a few weeks before his death. But he died before he could complete the compositions of the film and was later replaced.

Berny-Ignatius was accused for plagiarism for at least three of the songs in the film. The song "Ente Manasinoru Naanam" is said to be an adaptation of the popular Hindi classic "Piya Milanko Jaana", sung by Pankaj Mullick. Another song in the film, "Nila Pongal" is accused to be an imitation of a Bengali song, "Sun Mere Bandhu Re". The "Manam Thelinje vanne" song is a copy of the Ilaiyaraaja song "Aasai Athigam" from the Tamil movie "Marupadiyum". Berny-Ignatius were awarded the Kerala State Film Award for Best Music Director despite the allegations, which created a controversy. Veteran music director G. Devarajan returned three of the four state awards he had won claiming that the government was honouring pirates in film music.

Reception
The film ran for more than 250 days in theatres and was the highest-grossing Malayalam film of the year  The film is remembered as one of the best comedy films in the history of Malayalam cinema. Film critic Kozhikodan included the film on his list of the 10 best Malayalam movies of all time.

Awards 
 National Film Awards
 Best Production Design- Sabu Cyril
 Best Cinematographer- K. V. Anand

Filmfare Awards South

Filmfare Award for Best Actress – Malayalam – Shobhana

 Kerala State Film Awards
 Best Film with Popular Appeal and Aesthetic Value
 Best Art Director – Sabu Cyril
 Best Music Director- Berny-Ignatius
 Second Best Actor – Nedumudi Venu
 Second Best Actress – Kaviyoor Ponnamma

Remakes 
The film was remade in Tamil as Muthu (1995), in Hindi as Saat Rang Ke Sapne (1998) by Priyadarshan himself, in Kannada as Sahukara (2004). and in Bangla (Bangladesh) as Raja (1999).

References

External links 
 

1994 romantic comedy films
1994 films
1990s Malayalam-language films
Films whose cinematographer won the Best Cinematography National Film Award
Malayalam films remade in other languages
Films scored by Berny–Ignatius
Films shot in Pollachi
Films shot in Karnataka
Films whose production designer won the Best Production Design National Film Award
Indian romantic comedy films
Films directed by Priyadarshan